Leslie William Sutherland,  (17 December 1892 – 24 October 1967) was an Australian aviator and flying ace credited with eight aerial victories while serving with the Australian Flying Corps in the First World War.

References

1892 births
1967 deaths
Australian Army officers
Australian Flying Corps officers
Australian recipients of the Distinguished Conduct Medal
Australian recipients of the Military Cross
Australian World War I flying aces
Aviators from Melbourne
Military personnel from Melbourne
Royal Australian Air Force officers
People from Murrumbeena, Victoria